Cayetana were an American rock band from Philadelphia, Pennsylvania.

History
Kelly Olsen and Allegra Anka first met while enrolled in a New York college before moving back to their hometown of Philadelphia, where they met Augusta Koch. Cayetana began performing music together in 2011. They released their first extended play, titled Cayetana EP, in 2012. 

In early 2014, they signed to Tiny Engines and that March released a 7" titled Hot Dad Calendar.

On September 9, 2014, Cayetana released their debut full-length album titled Nervous Like Me via Tiny Engines.  Two years later, Cayetana released an EP on Asian Man Records titled Tired Eyes. Also in 2016, Cayetana released a split on Poison City Records with Camp Cope.

In 2017, they released their second full-length New Kind of Normal, which was released on their own Plum Records label.

In 2019, Cayetana announced that they would be breaking up, and they played their final show in Philadelphia on August 3, 2019.

Band members
Augusta Koch (vocals, guitar)
Allegra Anka (bass)
Kelly Olsen (drums)

Discography
Studio albums
 Nervous Like Me (2014, Tiny Engines)
 New Kind of Normal (2017, Plum Records)

EPs
Cayetana EP (2012, self-released)
Hot Dad Calendar (2014, Tiny Engines)
Tired Eyes (2016, Asian Man)
Splits
 Cayetana/Camp Cope (2016, Poison City)
Compilations
 not what we meant by NEW KIND OF NORMAL (2020, self-released)

References

External links
 Cayetana on Bandcamp

2011 establishments in Pennsylvania
All-female punk bands
Indie rock musical groups from Pennsylvania
Pop punk groups from Pennsylvania
Musical groups established in 2011
Musical groups from Philadelphia
Emo revival groups
American emo musical groups
Tiny Engines artists